Qayamat may refer to :

 Islamic eschatology ("Qayāmat")
 Qayamat (1983 film), an Indian film
 Qayamat – A Love Triangle In Afghanistan, a 2003 Pakistani film
 Qayamat: City Under Threat, a 2003 Indian film
 Qayamat (TV series), a 2021 Pakistani television series
 Kayamath, Indian TV series
 Qayamat Ki Raat, Indian supernatural television drama
 Qayamat Se Qayamat Tak, 1988 Indian Hindi-language romance film

See also
 Qiyama (disambiguation)